Eduardo Mata (5 September 19425 January 1995) was a Mexican conductor and composer.

Career 
Mata was born in Mexico City. He studied guitar privately for three years before enrolling in the National Conservatory of Music. From 1960 to 1963 he studied composition under Carlos Chávez,  and Julián Orbón. In 1964 he received a Koussevitzky Memorial Fellowship to study at Tanglewood. There, he studied conducting with Max Rudolf and Erich Leinsdorf and composition with Gunther Schuller.

He composed several works in the 1950s and 1960s, including three symphonies and chamber works, which include sonatas for piano and for cello and piano. His Third Symphony and some of his chamber works have been recorded.

In 1965 he was appointed head of the Music Department of the National Autonomous University of Mexico (UNAM) and conductor of the Guadalajara Orchestra; He also conducted the orchestra at the university, which later became the National Autonomous University of Mexico Philharmonic Orchestra. In 1972, he left Mexico to take the position of principal conductor of the Phoenix Symphony. The next year he was appointed the Phoenix ensemble's music director, holding that position through the 1977–78 season.

In 1965, he was one of the founding members and later, honorary president of the Mahler Mexico Society (Sociedad Mahler México) and together with Mexico's National Symphony Orchestra (Orquesta Sinfonica Nacional), in October 1975 he conducted the first full cycle of Gustav Mahler's symphonies in Mexico.

From 1977 to 1993 he was music director of the Dallas Symphony Orchestra and guest conductor of several orchestras in the U.S., Europe and Latin America. He recorded over fifty albums, most of them with the UNAM Symphony Orchestra, the Dallas Symphony Orchestra, and the London Symphony Orchestra. He was also appointed principal conductor of the New Zealand Symphony Orchestra and was about to take up this post in January 1995 when he was killed.

On the morning of 4 January 1995, Mata and a passenger were en route from Cuernavaca, Morelos, to Dallas, Texas. Mata was piloting his own Piper Aerostar. One engine failed shortly after takeoff, and the plane crashed during an emergency landing attempt. Both died in the crash, near Mexico City.

Selected compositions 
 Trio, for clarinet, drum, and cello, dedicated to Ralph Vaughan Williams (1957) 
 Sonata, for piano  (1960)
 Improvisaciones, for clarinet and piano (1961)
 Symphony No. 1 (1962)
 "Débora", ballet suite (1963)
 Los huesos secos (The Dry Bones), ballet (1963)
 Symphony No. 2 (1963)
 Aires (1964) 
 Improvisación número 1, for string quartet and piano four-hands (1964)
 Improvisación número 2, for strings and two pianos (1965) 
 Improvisación número 3,  for violin and piano (1965) 
 Sonata, for cello (1966), dedicated to Adolfo Odnoposoff
 Symphony No. 3, for winds and horn (1966)

Selected discography 
Mata compositions
 Symphony No. 3, for wind orchestra and solo horn. Orquesta Filarmónica de la UNAM, RCA Red Seal  LP recording, 1 disc: analogue, 33⅓ rpm, stereo, 12 in. RCA Red Seal. México, D.F.: RCA Red Seal, 1971. .
 "Improvisación No. 2," for strings and two pianos. Orquesta Filarmónica de la UNAM, LP recording, 1 disc: analogue, 33⅓ rpm, stereo, 12 in. RCA Red Seal. México, D.F.: RCA Red Seal, [1970].

References

Sources

Further reading

 Anon. 1976. Who's Who in the West, 15th edition (1976–1977). Chicago: Marquis Who's Who.  .
 Anon. 1980. "Mata, ". The New Grove Dictionary of Music and Musicians, first edition, edited by Stanley Sadie. London: Macmillan.
 Anon. 1986. "Mata [correct title needed].The New Grove Dictionary of American Music, edited by H. Wiley Hitchcock and Stanley Sadie, 4 vols. London: Macmillan.  (set); . , .
 Anon. 1992. Who's Who in Entertainment, second edition (1992–1993). Wilmette, Illinois: Marquis Who's Who.  .
 Anon. 1993a. "Eduardo Mata". International Who's Who, 57th edition (1993–94). London: Europa Publications. . .
 Anon. 1993b. "Eduardo Mata". Who's Who in the South and Southwest, 23rd edition (1993–94). New Providence, New Jersey: Marquis Who's Who.   .
 Anon. 1996. "Eduardo Mata". Who Was Who in America: A Companion Biographical Reference Work to Who's who in America 11 (1993–1996).  Chicago: Marquis Who's Who. .
 Anon. 1998. Latin American Lives: Selected Biographies from the Five-Volume Encyclopedia of Latin American History and Culture. Macmillan Compendium. New York: Macmillan Library Reference USA. . .
 Anon. 2001. "Mata". Baker's Biographical Dictionary of Musicians, 9th edition, edited by Laura Diane Kuhn, 6 vols. London: Macmillan; New York: G. Schirmer. .
 Cornell, Charles R., and Rene J. Montalvo  (eds.). 2002. Biography Index, 27 (September 2001 – August 2002). New York: H. W. Wilson Company.  .
 Ficher, Miguel, Martha Furman Schleifer, and John M. Furman (eds.). 2002. Latin American Classical Composers, second edition. Lanham, Maryland: Scarecrow Press. .
 Gaster, Adrian (ed.) 1990. International Who's Who in Music and Musicians' Directory, 12th edition. Cambridge, UK: International Who's Who in Music. .
 Marquis, Albert Nelson, and Marquis Who's Who, Inc. 1993. "Eduardo Mata". Who's Who in America, 48th edition (1994), 3 vols. New Providence, New Jersey: Marquis Who's Who.  .
 Slonimsky, Nicolas (ed.). 1997. Biographical Dictionary of Twentieth-Century Classical Musicians. New York: G. Schirmer. .
 Stevenson, Joseph. 2005a. "Dallas Symphony Orchestra". All Music Guide to Classical Music, edited by Chris Woodstra, Gerald Brennan, and Allen Schrott, 339–340. San Francisco: Backbeat Books. . .
 Unterburger, Amy L., and Jane L. Delgado (eds.). 1994.  Who's Who among Hispanic Americans, third edition (1994–95), foreword by Ricardo R. Fernández. Detroit: Gale Research.   .
 Vinton, John (ed.). 1974. Dictionary of Contemporary Music. New York: E. P. Dutton. .

1942 births
1995 deaths
Aviators killed in aviation accidents or incidents
Classical musicians from Texas
Male conductors (music)
Members of El Colegio Nacional (Mexico)
Mexican composers
Mexican male composers
Mexican conductors (music)
Musicians from Dallas
People from Mexico City
20th-century conductors (music)
20th-century American composers
20th-century American male musicians
Victims of aviation accidents or incidents in Mexico
Victims of aviation accidents or incidents in 1995